Encheloclarias is a genus of airbreathing catfishes endemic to Southeast Asia.

Species 
There are currently seven recognized species in this genus:
 Encheloclarias baculum P. K. L. Ng & K. K. P. Lim, 1993
 Encheloclarias curtisoma P. K. L. Ng & K. K. P. Lim, 1993
 Encheloclarias kelioides P. K. L. Ng & K. K. P. Lim, 1993
 Encheloclarias medialis H. H. Ng, 2012
 Encheloclarias prolatus P. K. L. Ng & K. K. P. Lim, 1993
 Encheloclarias tapeinopterus (Bleeker, 1852)
 Encheloclarias velatus H. H. Ng & H. H. Tan, 2000

Encheloclarias are often found deep within the substratum of peat swamps.

This genus differs from Heterobranchus and Dinotopterus in lacking extensions of the neural spine supporting the adipose fin.

References

 
Fish of Southeast Asia
Catfish genera
Freshwater fish genera
Taxa named by Albert William Herre
Taxa named by George S. Myers
Taxonomy articles created by Polbot